Christopher Karlton Gwynn (born October 13, 1964) is a former Major League Baseball outfielder. He is the younger brother of Hall of Famer Tony Gwynn and the uncle of former Major League Baseball outfielder Tony Gwynn Jr.

Career
The California Angels drafted Gwynn in the fifth round of the 1982 Major League Baseball Draft. However, Gwynn did not sign with the Angels, opting to attend San Diego State University, where he played college baseball for the San Diego State Aztecs baseball team. Gwynn played for the United States national baseball team in the 1984 Summer Olympics, winning a silver medal.

Gwynn was drafted by the Los Angeles Dodgers in the first round (tenth overall) of the 1985 Major League Baseball Draft. He made his MLB debut in 1987. While with the Dodgers, Gwynn made the final out in Dennis Martínez's perfect game on July 28, 1991. After that season, the Dodgers traded Gwynn with minor leaguer Domingo Mota to the Kansas City Royals for Todd Benzinger. He played two seasons with the Kansas City Royals (1992–1993). Gwynn signed with the Dodgers as a free agent after the 1993 season, and he played with them in 1994 and 1995. He joined his older brother Tony on the San Diego Padres for his final season in 1996.

On September 29, 1996, in the final game of the season, Gwynn hit what would prove to be the game-winning, two-run, pinch-hit double in the top of the 11th inning against Los Angeles Dodgers pitcher Chan Ho Park to complete a three-game sweep of the Dodgers and clinch the Padres' second National League West division championship in team history. It was the final regular season at bat of his career, however he also pinch-hit in each of the first two games of the subsequent Divisional series loss to the St. Louis Cardinals, garnering hits in both of those at bats, ending his career on a 3-for-3 streak. Gwynn hit two pinch-hit walk-off home runs during his career.

In a 10-year career spanning 599 games, Gwynn posted a .261 batting average (263-for-1007) with 119 runs, 17 home runs and 118 RBI. An excellent outfielder playing at all three outfield positions and several games at first base, he committed only one error in 382 total chances for a .997 fielding percentage. His only miscue in the majors occurred on September 28, 1993, as a member of the Kansas City Royals against the Cleveland Indians.

Post-playing career
Gwynn became a scout for the Padres once his playing career ended. In 2011, he was the Director of Player Personnel for the Padres. After the 2011 season, Gwynn became the Director of Player Development for the Seattle Mariners. He lives in California with his wife JoAnn, his son and his daughter.

References

External links

1964 births
Living people
African-American baseball players
San Diego State Aztecs baseball players
Major League Baseball left fielders
Baseball players from Los Angeles
Baseball players from Long Beach, California
Los Angeles Dodgers players
Kansas City Royals players
San Diego Padres players
San Diego Padres scouts
Baseball players at the 1984 Summer Olympics
Vero Beach Dodgers players
San Antonio Dodgers players
Albuquerque Dukes players
Medalists at the 1984 Summer Olympics
Olympic silver medalists for the United States in baseball
All-American college baseball players
21st-century African-American people
20th-century African-American sportspeople
Anchorage Glacier Pilots players
Long Beach Polytechnic High School alumni